Utkarsh Saurabh Chandra (born 24 March 1983) is an Indian former cricketer.

Chandra was born at Lucknow in March 1983. He played representative cricket for the Uttar Pradesh cricket team, making six List A one-day appearances in the Ranji Trophy One-Day competition between 2002 and 2007. Playing as a right-arm medium pace bowler, he took 3 wickets at an expensive average of 65.66, with best figures of 2 for 32. He later studied in England at Anglia Ruskin University, where he made a single appearance in first-class cricket for Cambridge UCCE against Sussex at Fenner's in 2009. He took a single wicket in the match, that of Sussex opener Michael Yardy in their first innings, though he was expensive, conceding 112 runs from 19 overs bowled. Returning to India, he was a selector for the Uttar Pradesh Cricket Association in 2017.

Notes and references

External links

1983 births
Living people
People from Lucknow
Indian cricketers
Uttar Pradesh cricketers
Alumni of Anglia Ruskin University
Cambridge MCCU cricketers
Indian cricket administrators